Jeremy Kellem (born June 6, 1989) is an American football defensive back who is currently a free agent. He played college football at Middle Tennessee State University and attended Deerfield Beach High School in Deerfield Beach, Florida. He has also been a member of the New Orleans VooDoo and Omaha Nighthawks.

College career
Kellem played from 2007 to 2010 with the Middle Tennessee Blue Raiders. He was named First-Team All-Sun Belt as a junior and senior. He was also named to the ESPN Academic All-American team. Kellem finished his college career with 286 total tackles, six sacks and ten interceptions, two of which were returned for touchdowns.

Professional career

New Orleans VooDoo
Kellem was signed by the New Orleans VooDoo on October 21, 2011. He was named Second Team All-Arena as a rookie in 2012 after recording 95.5 total tackles and eight interceptions.

Omaha Nighthawks
Kellem spent the 2012 season with the Omaha Nighthawks of the United Football League.

Arizona Rattlers
Kellem signed with the Arizona Rattlers on November 8, 2012. He was a member of the Rattlers teams that won ArenaBowl XXVI and ArenaBowl XXVII. He earned First Team All-Arena honors in 2015 after recording 95.5 total tackles and fourteen interceptions. Kellem was also named AFL Defensive Back of the Year in 2015.

References

External links
Just Sports Stats
College stats
NFL Draft Scout

Living people
1989 births
Players of American football from Florida
American football defensive backs
African-American players of American football
Middle Tennessee Blue Raiders football players
New Orleans VooDoo players
Omaha Nighthawks players
Arizona Rattlers players
Sportspeople from Broward County, Florida
Deerfield Beach High School alumni
21st-century African-American sportspeople
20th-century African-American people
People from Deerfield Beach, Florida